General Hunt may refer to:

Henry Jackson Hunt (1819–1889), Chief of Artillery in the Army of the Potomac during the American Civil War
Ira A. Hunt Jr. (born 1924), U.S. Army major general
LeRoy P. Hunt (1892–1968), U.S. Marine Corps general
Lewis Cass Hunt (1824–1886), Union Army brigadier general
Malcolm Hunt (born 1938), Royal Marines major general
Peter Hunt (British Army officer) (1916–1988), British Army general
Theodore Gaillard Hunt, Louisiana Militia brigadier general

See also
Gustav Hundt (1894–1945), German Wehrmacht lieutenant general
Attorney General Hunt (disambiguation)